Andrés Roberto Imperiale (born July 8, 1986) is an Argentine football defender who plays for San Luis in Primera B de Chile.

Career

Imperiale made his first team debut for Rosario Central in 2005 with Cuffaro Russo as the manager. By 2007, he established himself as a regular member of the first team squad. He has played in central defense and as a left-back. In 2009, he joined Bolivian side Oriente Petrolero on loan by request of team manager Pablo Sánchez at the time. He scored his first professional goal in league play on May 31, 2009, in a 2–0 home victory over club Universitario. In January 2010, he was loaned out to fierce rival Blooming. Later in the year he transferred to Cypriot club Doxa Katokopia before he moved to Aris Limassol not long after.

In 2012, he reunited with manager Pablo Sánchez at Chilean club Universidad de Concepción where he stayed for three seasons before moving to Deportivo Saprissa in 2015. In January 2016, he signed with the San Jose Earthquakes of Major League Soccer.

Imperiale left San Jose in December 2017 for Paraguayan side Club Guaraní.

Club titles

References

External links
 
 Argentine Primera statistics  
 Andrés Imperiale profile at Football-Lineups
 Goal.com player profile  
 

1986 births
Living people
Footballers from Rosario, Santa Fe
Argentine footballers
Argentine expatriate footballers
Association football defenders
Rosario Central footballers
San Martín de Tucumán footballers
Oriente Petrolero players
Club Blooming players
Doxa Katokopias FC players
Universidad de Concepción footballers
Deportivo Saprissa players
San Jose Earthquakes players
Club Guaraní players
Deportes Iquique footballers
Chilean Primera División players
Cypriot First Division players
Cypriot Second Division players
Argentine Primera División players
Liga FPD players
Major League Soccer players
Paraguayan Primera División players
Expatriate footballers in Chile
Expatriate footballers in Cyprus
Expatriate footballers in Bolivia
Expatriate footballers in Costa Rica
Expatriate soccer players in the United States
Expatriate footballers in Paraguay
Argentine expatriate sportspeople in Chile
Argentine expatriate sportspeople in Bolivia